Autophagy related 7 is a protein in humans encoded by ATG7 gene. Related to GSA7; APG7L; APG7-LIKE.

ATG 7, present in both plant and animal genomes, acts as an essential protein for cell degradation and its recycling. The sequence associates with the ubiquitin- proteasome system, UPS, required for the unique development of an autophagosomal membrane and fusion within cells.

ATG7 was identified based on homology to yeast cells Pichia pastoris GSA7 and Saccharomyces cerevisiae APG7. The protein appears to be required for fusion of peroxisomal and vacuolar membranes.

Autophagy is an important cellular process that helps in maintaining homeostasis. It goes through destroying and recycling the cytoplasmic organelles and macromolecules. During the initiation of autophagy, ATG7 acts like an E-1 enzyme for ubiquitin-like proteins (UBL) such as ATG12 and ATG8. ATG7 helps these UBL proteins in targeting their molecule by binding to them and activating their transfer to an E-2 enzyme. ATG7's role in both of these autophagy-specific UBL systems makes it an essential regulator of autophagosome assembly.

Homologous to the ATP-binding and catalytic sites of E1 activator proteins, ATG7 uses its cysteine residue to create a thiol-ester bond with free Ubiquitin molecules. Through UPS, Ubiquitin will continue to bind to other autophagy-related proteins, E2 conjugation proteins and E3 protein ligases, to attach Ubiquitins to a target substrate to induce autophagy.

ATG 7 is often associated with ATG12/ ATG5 sequenced ubiquitination cascade. As well in presence of p53 cell cycle pathways during stressed and nutrient poor environments.

References

Further reading

External links